Eduardo Gageiro (born 16 February 1935 in Sacavém) is a Portuguese photographer and photojournalist.

Beginnings
Gageiro became interested in photography at a very early age whilst working at the Sacavém Factory, with the life of its workers providing the theme to his early pictures. The first photograph of him to be published appeared on the front page of the Diário de Notícias, of Lisbon, when Gageiro was twelve years old.

Photographic career
He began his photojournalism career at Diário Ilustrado, later working for Vida Ribatejana, before joining weekly O Século in 1957. He later worked for Eva and also edited Sábado. He continues to work with various publications and press agencies, mainly the Portuguese Associated Press.

As well as his photojournalist work, Gageiro has produced several photobooks, often in collaboration with important Portuguese writers. He worked on Gente (1971), with José Cardoso Pires (whose introduction provides one of the earliest and most acute appraisals of Gageiro's work), on Lisboa Operária (1994), with David Mourão-Ferreira and, on Olhares (1999), with António Lobo Antunes. His book Lisboa no Cais da Memória (2003) reproduces some of the key images from these works and can be seen as an anthology of his work about Lisbon.
 
Gageiro had a worldwide exposure of his work when he photographed the events related to the Munich massacre that took place at the Olympic Games of 1972. He was also one of the main photographers of the events surrounding the Carnation Revolution in 1974, with Alfredo Cunha, such as the picture taken in the headquarters of the P.I.D.E. (Portugal's secret police), where he captured a young soldier unhanging a portrait of former dictator Salazar. Gageiro was also the official photographer during Ramalho Eanes Presidency.

Travels and prizes
Gageiro has photographed all around the world, including Cuba, where the Fidel Castro government allowed him to work with few restrictions, and East Timor, where he travelled to document life in the immediate post-independence period.

He received his first photographic prize in 1955. Since then he has gone on to win more than 300 prizes around the world. In 2005 he was awarded first prize at the 11th International Photography Exhibition in China, the world's biggest photography competition.

Influences
Gageiro work is similar of the postwar French photographers Henri Cartier-Bresson, Robert Doisneau and Willy Ronis. The vicissitudes of the daily life in all his monotony and the historical are recurring in his wide-ranging body of work. This does not mean that Gageiro's images are merely accurate snapshots, the decisive moment he tends to capture is often gently composed and finely balanced. True to this tradition, Gageiro works exclusively in black and white.

Jorge Pedro Sousa, in his thesis on the history of photojournalism in Portugal characterised Gageiro's photographic practice by the same "aesthetic-compositional quality, human value and dramatic form" that are also found in W. Eugene Smith and Henri Cartier-Bresson.

Photobibliography

 Gente (1971), with text by José Cardoso Pires
 Mulher (1978), with text by Maria Velho da Costa
 O Sol, o Muro, o Mar (1984), with text by Sophia de Mello Breyner Andresen
 China: a contra revolução tranquila (1985), by Cáceres Monteiro
 Mulher (1988), with text by Maria Judite de Carvalho
 Estas Crianças Aqui (1988), with text by Maria Rosa Colaço
 Alentejo: Relógio de Sol (1988), with text by Miguel Torga
 Lisboa Operária (1994), with text by David Mourão-Ferreira
 Revelações (1996), with text by Mário Soares and Nuno Brederode Santos
 Évora: Património da Humanidade (1997), with text by José Saramago
 Fotos de Abril (1999), with text by 25 authors
 Olhares (1999), with text by António Lobo Antunes
 Timor - No Amanhecer da Esperança (2000), with text by 6 authors
 A Fábrica e Sacavém (2003), with text by three authors
 Lisboa no Cais da Memória (2003), with text by Jorge Sampaio e António Valdemar
 Fé - Olhares Sobre o Sagrado (2004), with text by José Mattoso
 Silêncios (2008), with text by Lídia Jorge
 Lisboa Amarga e Doce (2012), with text by António Costa and Baptista-Bastos
 Lisboa, Tejo e Tudo (2012)
 Liberdade (2013)
 Tudo Isto É Fado (2014)

References

External links
Eduardo Gageiro Biography (Portuguese)

1935 births
Living people
Portuguese photographers
Portuguese photojournalists